Georg Karl Frederick (24 July 1796 in Hildburghausen – 3 August 1853 in Hummelshain) was a duke of Saxe-Altenburg.

Family
He was the fourth but second surviving son of Frederick, Duke of Saxe-Hildburghausen (of Saxe-Altenburg from 1826) and Duchess Charlotte Georgine of Mecklenburg-Strelitz. He fought in the Austrian ranks against Napoleonic France in the 1813–1814 war.

Georg succeeded his brother Joseph as Duke of Saxe-Altenburg when he abdicated, in 1848.

Marriage and issue
In Ludwigslust on 7 October 1825 Georg married with Duchess Marie Louise of Mecklenburg-Schwerin. She was a daughter of Frederick Louis, Hereditary Grand Duke of Mecklenburg-Schwerin and Grand Duchess Elena Pavlovna of Russia.

They had three sons:
 Ernst I Frederick Paul Georg Nikolaus (b. Hildburghausen, 16 September 1826 – d. Altenburg, 7 February 1908); married Princess Agnes of Anhalt-Dessau.
 Albrecht Frederick August Bernhard Ludwig Anton Carl Gustav Eduard (b. Hildburghausen, 31 October 1827 – d. Ludwigslust, 28 May 1835).
 Moritz Franz Friedrich Constantin Alexander Heinrich August Carl Albrecht (b. Eisenberg, 24 October 1829 – d. Arco, Italy, 13 May 1907); married Princess Augusta of Saxe-Meiningen.

Ancestry

References 
 Heinrich Ferdinand Schoeppl: Die Herzoge von Sachsen-Altenburg. (Das Herzogliche Haus von Sachsen-Altenburg; Bd. 1). Altenburger Verlag, Altenburg 1992 (Nachdr. d. Ausg. Bozen 1917). 
 Rudolf Armin Human: Chronik der Stadt Hildburghausen. Verlag Frankenschwelle, Hildburghausen 1999,  (Nachdr. d. Ausg. Hildburghausen 1886).

1796 births
1853 deaths
People from Saxe-Hildburghausen
People from Hildburghausen
House of Saxe-Altenburg
Dukes of Saxe-Altenburg
German military personnel of the Napoleonic Wars
Austrian Empire military personnel of the Napoleonic Wars
Princes of Saxe-Altenburg